Radio Jajce is a Bosnian local public radio station, broadcasting from Jajce, Bosnia and Herzegovina.

In 1966, Radio Jajce was launched by the municipal council.

After the war in Bosnia and Herzegovina, in 1997, radio station was formally reopened by local municipal council. In Yugoslavia and in SR Bosnia and Herzegovina, it was part of local/municipal Radio Sarajevo network affiliate. This radio station broadcasts a variety of programs such as news, music, morning and talk shows. Program is mainly produced in Bosnian language and Croatian language.

Estimated number of potential listeners of Radio Jajce is around 24.486.

Frequencies
 Jajce 
 Vinac

See also 
List of radio stations in Bosnia and Herzegovina

References

External links 
 www.radiojajce.ba
 Communications Regulatory Agency of Bosnia and Herzegovina
Jajce
Jajce
Radio stations established in 1966
Radio stations established in 1997